Peltoceras is an extinct ammonite genus from the  aspidoceratid subfamily Peltoceratinae that lived during the later part of the Middle Jurassic (U Callovian).

The shell of Peltoceras is evolute with whorls hardly embracing, so that all whorls are mostly exposed. The outer rim, which is known as the venter, aligning with the lower part or belly of the animal, is nearly flat. Inner whorls have strong ribs that bifurcate and trifurcate on the ventral margin. The outer whorls have large simple ribs and two rows of massive lateral tubercles, the outer row developing first.

References
 Arkell, et al., 1957. Mesozoic Ammonoidea; Treatise on Invertebrate Paleontology, Part L. (Ammonoidea) p. L335-336. Geol Soc of America and Univ Kansas Press. 

Jurassic ammonites
Ammonites of Europe
Callovian life
Ammonitida genera
Aspidoceratidae